Joselyn Dumas (born 31 August 1980)  is a Ghanaian television host and actress. In 2014 she starred in A Northern Affair, a role that earned her a Ghana Movie Award and an Africa Movie Academy Award nomination for Best Actress.

Early life
Dumas was born in Ghana and spent her early childhood in Accra, Ghana. She had her basic education at Morning Star School and proceeded to the Archbishop Porter Girls High School where she became the Entertainment Prefect. Joselyn furthered her studies in the United States where she studied to earn a Degree in Administrative Law.

Career

TV career
Joselyn Dumas was a practicing paralegal until she relocated to Ghana to follow her dreams of becoming a Television personality. She made her debut on Television as the host of Charter House's Rhythmz, an entertainment show, which saw her interview many celebrities. She was head hunted by the defunct TV Network, ViaSat 1 to host their first own produced flagship Talk show, The One Show, which was aired from 2010 to 2014. She was the host for the TV talk show At Home with Joselyn Dumas which aired across Africa and parts of Europe

Film career
Her role in Perfect Picture, made a lasting impression on the director which led to subsequent key roles in other movies. Her big break came two years later in the Shirley Frimpong-Manso movie series Adams Apples. The role of "Jennifer Adams" in Adams Apples got her nominated for Best Actress in a lead role alongside Hollywood Actress Kimberly Elise at the 2011 Ghana Movie Awards. Ever since Joselyn Dumas came unto the acting scene in Ghana. She has played key roles in movies and series such as Love or Something Like That, A Sting in a Tale, Perfect Picture, A Northern Affair and Lekki Wives. She has starred alongside some of Africa's actors, including John Dumelo, Majid Michel of Ghana and OC Ukeje of Nigeria.

Producer
She co-produced Miss Malaika Ghana, one of the prestigious beauty pageant in Ghana, from 2008 to 2010. She is also the founder and CEO of Virgo Sun Company Limited, a production entity which under her directorship, has already co-produced its first movie Love or Something Like that, endorsed by the UNAIDS. She hopes to produce as well as invest in more television programs or series like V Republic, an edgy television series produced by Sparrow Productions with Executive Production by VirgoSun.

Special appearance
Dumas featured as the bride in Lynxx hit song "Fine Lady" featuring Wizkid.

Endorsements
She is currently the Brand ambassador of Range Rover Evoque Ghana and Jobberman Ghana, a jobs advertisement company.

Events and shows
She was a co-host with Ayo Makun at the 2018 Golden Movie Awards Africa held at the Movenpick Ambassador Hotel in Accra on June 2, 2018, Ghana

Foundation
She believes in giving back to society, especially where children are concerned. Her passion for philanthropic work led to the establishment of The Joselyn Canfor-Dumas Foundation (JCDF) to help address the needs of vulnerable children from all backgrounds and regions of Ghana. The JCD foundation is currently undertaking a project with focus on Autism.

Filmography

Awards and recognitions

References

31.

https://guardian.ng/life/joselyn-dumas-i-have-a-very-funny-side/ She reveals she has a very funny side

Living people
1980 births
Ghanaian film actresses
Archbishop Porter Girls' Senior High School alumni